This article mentions the introduction and confirmation process for any successful or unsuccessful cabinet nominees of Mir-Hossein Mousavi during his administration.

First cabinet

References 

 
1st legislature of the Islamic Republic of Iran
2nd legislature of the Islamic Republic of Iran